Félix Cortes (born 5 July 1907, date of death unknown) was a Filipino sports shooter. He competed in two events at the 1952 Summer Olympics.

References

External links
 

1907 births
Year of death missing
Filipino male sport shooters
Olympic shooters of the Philippines
Shooters at the 1952 Summer Olympics
Place of birth missing
Shooters at the 1954 Asian Games
Asian Games competitors for the Philippines
20th-century Filipino people